Branjina is a settlement in the region of Baranja, Croatia. Administratively, it is located in the Popovac municipality within the Osijek-Baranja County. Population is 322 people.
Until the end of World War II, the Inhabitants was Danube Swabians, also called locally as Stifolder, because there Ancestors once came at the 17th century and 18th century from Fulda (district). Mostly of the former German Settlers was expelled to Allied-occupied Germany and Allied-occupied Austria in 1945-1948, about the Potsdam Agreement.

References

Populated places in Osijek-Baranja County
Baranya (region)